There are a number of universities in Queensland, Australia, all with distinct academic dress.

University of Queensland
The University of Queensland follows the Cambridge pattern for its Academic regalia. The nuances in the design of hoods and gowns are part of the Groves classification system of academic regalia. Before the current colour coding system, which consists of special dye colours described in the British Colour Codes, there was a more complex course-based colour system for each degree. Revisions took place during 1998, with changes visible in the graduating classes of 1999. With the Queensland College of Agriculture merger at Gatton in 1990, a series of other complications arose with the Gatton Council wearing robes unique to them; however, the council was disbanded circa 2005.

Robes
The robe is based on the Cambridge design with bell sleeves and gathering at the shoulders and across the back. Straight panels are at the front and worn open with arms placed through the openings at the front of the sleeves for Certificates, Diplomas, Bachelor's, and graduates up to masters. Masters robes are more ornate, with the pointed ends on the elongated sleeves being a type that is recognised as being a long-sleeved robe for graduates with awards of Masters, Juris Doctorates, and Professional Doctorates. A Doctor of Philosophy also has panels of scarlet silk down the front, and the Higher and Honorary Doctorates is a bright red robe with gold-lined flowing sleeves and panels down the front.

Stoles
Students graduating from either Certificate or Diploma programs are permitted to wear a stole over their gown. The stoles' colour denotes the rank of the graduate. All stoles are without pleats at the neck.
 Certificate - Pearl White 
 Diploma - Royal Blue
 Associate Diploma Undergraduate - Saffron
 Associate Diploma Graduate - Silver
 Graduate Certificate - Ruby 
 Graduate Diploma - Gold

All awards with graduate in its title wear the award of Bachelorhood over the stole.

A special provision is made for graduates from Indigenous Australian communities (either Aboriginal or Torres Strait Islander), allowing them to wear a stole representing their communities' flag. The Aboriginal stole is divided equally down the center (length-ways), with ruby on the left and black on the right and is fringed at the ends in gold.

Hoods
On top (of the stole, if awarded in the case of Graduate Certificates or Graduate Diplomas; otherwise, on top of the gown) is the Cambridge hood type 1 in the Groves classification system, with the special dye lots colours, which have long been made by one historical Robe maker. The black Cambridge hood is a design classified in Groves with the design changed by the award (whether Bachelor, Master's or Doctorate). Each award has its own gown and hood. Bachelor's degree holders wear hoods partially lined with white silk; for Masters and Juris Doctors the hood is fully lined with blue silk; for Doctorate of Philosophy graduates, the hood is fully lined with crimson silk; and for Professional Doctorates, it is fully lined with burgundy silk. Higher doctorates and honorary doctorates are an exception, in their case the gown is made of the finest material in a special dye lot - red, with gold silk panels and gold-lined sleeves with a bright red hood lined in gold silk.

Headwear
All are awards up to and including the award of Masters wear a black trencher with a black tassel. Professional Doctorates, Doctorates of Philosophy and Higher Doctorates, wear a black velvet Tudor bonnet with a red silk cord tied in a decorative bow with two red silk tassels hanging on the left-hand side. A distinction is the Higher Doctorate which has a gold tassel.

Queensland University of Technology

The basic robes of Queensland University of Technology (QUT) are the black Cambridge-style robes that are common throughout the Queensland universities along with the black mortar board. All undergraduates at official Academic functions wear these robes.

Robes
Three styles of robes are worn at academic functions. The first type is a black Cambridge gown. It is worn by undergraduates, Associate Diploma/Degree, Diploma, Bachelors, Honors, and Graduate Diploma/Certificate.

The second type is a black Cambridge-style master's gown. This is worn by Professional Doctorate holders, Doctors of Philosophy and members of the University Council. Differences, in this case, are that Professional Doctorate holder's gowns have facings in the colours of their faculty, whereas those graduating with a Doctorate of Philosophy have crimson facings. Councillors wear this gown with gold bullion and cream embossed trimming and vertical gold bullion edging.

The third type is a Cambridge doctor's gown. These are scarlet in colour and are lined in the appropriate colours. Higher Doctorate holders wear this gown with gold linings and facings. Those who are Doctors of the university wear it with facings and linings in University Blue.

Several other distinctive gowns are worn however they are reserved for the Alumni President, the Vice-Chancellor and the Chancellor. The gown of the Alumni President is a university blue Cambridge gown embellished with 1 cm wide silver braid. The Chancellors and Vice-Chancellor's robes are university blue and Cambridge patterned. The facings, sleeve edges, shoulders and collar are embellished with braids. These braids' design is based on the floral emblem of Queensland, the Cooktown Orchid. The differences between the Chancellor and the Vice-Chancellor are in the colour of the braid, gold for the Chancellor and silver for the Vice-Chancellor.

Hoods

All graduates of the university wear hoods. The hoods are black in all cases below the rank of the Doctorate of Philosophy. A band of silk placed 50mm from the edge of the hood in the colour of the faculty denotes the rank of the graduate. Associate Degree/Diploma holder's band is 25mm thick, Diploma 50mm thick, Bachelors and Honours are 100mm thick. Graduate Certificate and Diploma hoods are the same as Bachelor hoods with the addition of a border of pearl silk 25mm thick.

Professional Doctorates, Masters, Doctorates of Philosophy and members of the university council wear hoods of black. Professional Doctorates and Masters hoods are fully lined with silk in the colour of the appropriate faculty. Doctorates of Philosophy wear hoods fully lined in scarlet and Members of the University Council wear hoods fully lined in gold.

Higher Doctorates and Doctors of the university wear a red Cambridge-style hood. These are lined in gold and university blue respectively. The Alumni President, Chancellor and Vice-Chancellor do not wear hoods.

Headwear

Black mortar boards are worn by all graduates up to and inclusive of the master's degree.

All Doctorate holders wear black velvet Tudor bonnets, with cord and tassels of diagnostic colours. Professional Doctorates' cords and tassels are of the colour of the faculty, Doctorates of Philosophy are red, and Higher Doctorates and Doctors of the university have gold cords and tassels.

University blue Trenchers are worn by the Alumni President, Chancellor and Vice-Chancellor. The tassel of the Alumni President and the Vice-Chancellor is silver, the Chancellor's is gold. The trencher of the Chancellor and Vice-Chancellor is also edged in gold or silver respectively.

Faculty and Campus Colours

(Please note QUT is no longer using faculty specific colours. Effective from the mid-year 2021 ceremonies, all QUT Graduate Diploma, Graduate Certificate, and Masters hoods are in the QUT blue.) 

Faculties and the various campuses of the university have distinctive colours. The colour of the university itself is deep blue (PMS541). Faculties at the university and their respective colours are:

 Business - Blue (PMS279)
 Creative Industries - New Fuchsia (PMS247)
 Education - Green (PMS341)
 Health - Orange (PMS165)
 Humanities Program - Eggshell Blue (PMS304)
 Law - Grey (PMS430)
 Science and Engineering - Teal (PMS327)

James Cook University

The following represent the prescribed academic dress standards in respect of officers and graduates of James Cook University.

Robes

The robes are Cambridge-style. Black robes are worn by bachelor, Honours and Master's holders. All Doctorate holders wear royal blue Cambridge doctorate gowns. Professional Doctorates wear gowns with facings and linings in red. Doctorates of Philosophy wear gowns with facings and linings of red faille. The university offers three types of honorary doctorates: An Honorary Doctorate, An Honorary Doctor honoris causa, and an Honorary Doctor of the university. The doctorate robes are distinguished by their facings. Honorary doctorates have facings and linings of blue satin, Honorary Doctorates honoris causa are similar with the addition of a gold edging stripe in satin, and Honorary Doctors of the university have linings and facings in gold satin.

Members of the University Council wear black Cambridge-style master's gowns. The Chancellor and Vice-Chancellor wear robes of lightweight dark blue wool, trimmed and lined with gold or silver braid respectively.

Hoods

All hoods are of Oxford style. Bachelors, Honours and Masters Graduates hoods are black. Bachelor hoods are lined in blue satin, Honours hoods are the same with an edging strip in gold satin. Masters hoods are fully lined in gold satin. Members of the university council wear a Master's hood entirely lined with silver satin rather than gold.

The hoods of Professional Doctorates are made of red fabric lined in royal blue faille. All other doctorate hoods are in royal blue fabric distinguished by their linings. Doctorates of Philosophy are lined with red faille, Honorary Doctorates are lined with blue satin, Honorary Doctorates honoris causa are lined with blue satin with an edging strip in gold, and Honorary Doctors of the university have hoods lined entirely with gold satin.

Headwear

Black trenchers are worn by Bachelors, Honours and Masters graduates. Members of the University Council wear black trenchers with silver tassels. Professional Doctorates achieved by coursework also wear trenchers, these being in royal blue with royal blue tassels.

All other doctorates wear Tudor Bonnets. Professional Doctorates achieved by research wear a red Tudor bonnet with a gold cord and tassels. All other doctorate bonnets are of royal blue velvet with a gold cord and two gold tassels.

The Chancellor and Vice-Chancellor wear Tudor bonnets of dark blue velvet with braid edging, cord and tassels in either gold or silver respectively.

Central Queensland University

Central Queensland University is different from most universities in Queensland in that hoods are not worn by any graduate under the rank of doctorate.

Robes

All graduates below the rank of Masters, members of the University Council and Companions of the university wear a black Bachelor Cambridge style robe. Masters graduates wear Cambridge Masters-style robes in black. CQU offers several different Doctorate programs. All of these share the same robe design. They are in the Oxford Doctorate pattern of green cloth with facings of blue, red and gold satin. The sleeves are fully lined with University blue satin, with red and gold satin edgings.

Honorary Doctorates wear Cambridge Doctorate patterned robes of scarlet cloth with facings in silver satin, sleeves fully lined in silver satin, fastened with a gold cord and button. Doctors of the university wear Cambridge Doctorate pattern of scarlet cloth with facings in University blue satin, edged with University gold, sleeves fully lined in University blue satin, fastened with a gold cord and button.

The Chancellor and Vice-Chancellor wear a black gown trimmed with braid on the front panels, the hem, and the sleeves. The robe also has a sailor-collar trimmed with braid and embroidered with an 18 cm CQU full-colour logo using metallic thread. All braid and metallic thread are either gold or silver respectively.

Stoles

Graduates below the rank of Doctor, Companions of the university and members of the University Council wear stoles. Companions wear a full-length stole of university blue, with the CQU logo embroidered in full colour on the top left side. Councillors' stoles are gold in colour, full length, with the CQU logo on the top left-hand side. They also have two 2 cm strips of satin diagonally across the bottom right-hand side; one of university green and one of university blue. Graduates' stoles are full length with the full-colour CQU logo embroidered at the top on both sides.

Graduate Stole Colours
The stole colours denote the rank of the degree. The Australian Standard Colour names and Degree ranks are:

 Certificates/Advanced Certificates/Diplomas - Driftwood
 Advanced Diplomas & Associate Degrees - Sunflower
 Bachelors - Opaline
 Bachelors With Honours - Jade
 Graduate Certificate - Powder Blue
 Graduate Diplomas - Ultramarine
 Masters - Violet.

Hoods

Professional Doctorates, Doctorates of Education and Doctorates of Business at CQU have hoods in the Oxford pattern made of green cloth, fully lined with University gold satin with red and blue satin edging, and fastened onto the front of the gown with 'hoodlinks' designed according to CQU's Logo.

Doctors of Philosophy have similar hoods, also in the Oxford Doctorate style made of blue cloth, fully lined with University green satin with red and gold satin edging, and fastened onto the front of the gown with 'hoodlinks' designed according to CQU's Logo.

Honorary doctorates wear a hood in the Cambridge pattern, made in scarlet cloth, and fully lined in silver satin. Doctors of the university wear a similar hood in scarlet; however, it is lined in university blue and edged in gold satin.

Headwear

All graduates below the rank of a Doctorate wear black mortar boards as do Companions of the university. Members of the University Council wear A black mortarboard with a gold tassel.

All doctorates aside from the Doctorate of Philosophy wear Tudor bonnets of green with a gold cord and tassels. The Doctorate of Philosophy wears a blue bonnet with gold cord and tassels. Honorary Doctorate holders and Doctors of the university wear a black Tudor bonnet with a gold cord and tassels.

The Chancellor and Vice Chancellor both wear Tudor bonnets with cord and tassels in gold or silver respectively.

University of Southern Queensland

Robes

All graduates below the rank of Master, wear a black Cambridge-style Bachelor's robe. Masters wear a black Cambridge-style Masters robe.

Doctorates of Philosophy and other research Doctorates wear a black Cambridge style doctoral gown, with facings of cardinal red, or the colour of the faculty, school or field of study respectively. All other doctorates awarded wear a Cambridge Masters gown in black. Several honorary doctorates are offered at USQ. Honorary (higher) Doctorates honoris causa (such as D.Sc. or D.Litt. et cetera) wear a scarlet Cambridge doctoral style robe with facings and sleeve linings in the Faculty, School or field of study colour and edged with gold. Doctors of the university honoris causa wear a scarlet Cambridge doctoral style robe with facings of vitrix blue and edged with gold and sleeves fully lined in vitrix blue and edged with gold.

Fellows of the university wear black Cambridge-styled Bachelors robes with facings of vitrix blue and linings of gold. Members of the University Council wear something similar with the addition of the USQ logo embroidered on the left facing.

The Chancellor, Vice-Chancellor and all Deputy Chancellors wear similar robes. They wear a black grosgrain gown, with facings down each side in front and a square collar at the back of the same material, edged with gold lace; the differences being in the placement of the lace on the sleeves. The spacing of the gold lace on the Chancellors sleeves is 4.5 cm, as opposed to Deputy Chancellors with a gold lace spacing of 11 cm. The Vice Chancellor, however, has gold laced trim to the sleeve openings.

Stoles

Stoles are only worn by associate degree, Diploma and Advanced Diploma holders. The stole is black, lined to 5 cm with the colour of the field of study. One exception to this is the associate degree in education which is black and fully lined in the colour of the faculty, school, or field of study.

Hoods

All hoods at USQ are full Cambridge-style hoods. Bachelors, Honours, Graduate and Postgraduate Diplomas and Combined degrees all wear black hoods, with a 10 cm lining of the colour of the field of study. Those taking combined degrees wear this hood but also with a recognition cord of the colour appropriate to the second field of study.

Masters, research Doctorates other than PhDs and any other non-honorary Doctorate awarded by USQ are assigned hoods fully lined with the colour of the field of study. There are several exceptions to this rule, however. The Master of Business Administration hood is fully lined in grey with Indian yellow edging, the Master of Business Information Technology hood is fully lined in grey with signal red edging, and the Master of Philosophy hood is fully lined in cardinal red. Doctorates of Philosophy wear a full Cambridge style hood fully lined in cardinal red.

Those offered honorary doctorates at the university wear full Cambridge hoods with an edging 2.5 cm deep in gold satin. The Honorary Higher Doctorates hoods are lined in the colour of their field of study. Doctors of the university have hoods lined in the victrix blue.

Members of the Council and the Chancellors do not wear hoods.

Headwear

Black cloth mortar boards are worn by all graduates below the rank of Doctorate, honorary Fellows of the university, and University Council members. All Chancellors wear a black cloth mortarboard with a gold braid, a metallic dome button and a full metallic tassel.

Black Tudor bonnets are worn by all Doctorate holders distinguished by the colour of the cord and tassels. Doctors of Philosophy wear the red cord and tassels, all other non-honorary Doctorates wear a cord and tassels in the colour of their field of study. All honorary Doctorates at USQ wear bonnets with a gold cord and gold tassels.

Colours

USQ denotes the faculties and fields of study with colour, as do many universities. These colour names are taken from the British Colour Council Dictionary of Colour Standards. Here follows a list of colours appropriate to the Faculties or the subjects which they offer.

 The Faculty of Arts - Pearl White
 The Faculty of Education - Lilac
 The Faculty of Business: 
 Business - French Grey
 Commerce - Indian Yellow
 Information Technology - Signal Red
The Faculty of Engineering and Surveying
 Engineering - Claret
 Surveying - Maroon
The Faculty of Sciences
 Sciences (including Psychology) - Spectrum Blue
 Nursing - Peacock Green
 Information Technology - Signal Red

Bond University

Robes 
All robes worn are Cambridge style. Black Bachelor gowns are worn by all below the rank of Doctor.

Stoles

Hoods 
All Bachelor hoods are black with a silk lining of the faculty colour. Masters hoods are dark blue with the lining of the Faculty colour.

Headwear 
All are awards up to and including the award of Masters wear a black trencher with a black tassel. Doctorates of Philosophy wear a black velvet Tudor bonnet.

Colours 
 Faculty of Law - lilac
 Faculty of Society and Design - white
 Faculty of Business - gold
 Faculty of Health Sciences and Medicine -

University of the Sunshine Coast

Robes

All robes worn are Cambridge style. Black Bachelor gowns are worn by all below the rank of Master. Senior Fellows of the university however also wear these gowns.

Masters style Gowns in black are worn by master's degree holders, the Yeoman Bedell and members of the University Council. Councillors' robes have facings in rifle green. The Bedell wears a Councillors' robe with black ornaments.

All recipients of doctoral degrees wear doctoral robes. The gowns of honorary Doctorates are in rifle green. Doctorates of Philosophy wear a black robe with facings and sleeve linings in new red. Professional Doctorates wear a black robe with sleeve linings and facings in the colour of the faculty in the degree was awarded in.

The Chancellor and Vice-Chancellor wear black woollen robes with trimmings in either gold or silver respectively.

Stoles

Stoles are worn by Senior Fellows of the university and graduates holding Graduate Certificates or Graduate Diplomas. The stole of a Senior Fellow is full length in Rifle Green silk. Those of Graduate Certificates and Diplomas are full length and black, and either edged to 2.5 cm or fully lined with (respectively) the colour of the faculty.

Hoods

Hoods are worn by all other graduates of the university. All hoods are black with one exception. Honorary Doctors of the university wear a Rifle Green Cambridge style hood lined in silk.

Bachelor's degree holders hood Oxford-Burgon style and are lined with silk to a depth of 15 cm in the colour of their faculty. However, in the case of honours degrees a 2 cm thick strip of black commencing 3 cm from the edge of the silk lining. In the case of combined bachelor's degrees, the lining of the hood is in two colours. On the right side of the hood, the silk lining is the colour of the first-named faculty, and on the left, the silk is that of the second-named faculty.

Master's degrees are differentiated by coursework and research at USC. Masters hoods are in the Oxford-Burgon fully lined with silk in the colour of the faculty. Those obtained through coursework, however, have a 2 cm black band of silk 3 cm from the edge. All doctorate hoods are in the Cambridge style. Professional Doctorate holders and Honorary Doctorates from the Faculties wear a hood lined in the colour of the faculty. Doctorates of Philosophy wear hoods fully lined in New Red.

The University of the Sunshine Coast has changed some details of its hoods, please see the universities website for more information.

Headwear

Black cloth trenchers are worn by all graduates below the rank of Doctorate. A black cloth trencher cap is also worn by Senior University Fellows and the Yeoman Bedell.

All other ranks of the university wear black velvet Tudor Bonnets differentiated by the colour of the cord and tassels. Graduates with professional doctorates have cords and tassels in black. Those holding Doctorates of Philosophy have a red cord and tassels. Honorary Higher Doctorates awarded by the university have cords and tassels of the colour of the faculty. Doctors of the university and University Council members have tassels and a cord in Rifle green. The Chancellor and Vice Chancellor have bonnets with cords and tassels in gold or silver respectively.

Award Colours

Violet - Sciences, Environmental and Related Studies
Academic Green - Business, Information Technology and Commerce
Spectrum Orange - Engineering and Related Technologies
White - Health, Nursing and Sport sciences
New Gold - Education
Royal Blue - Law, Criminology, Creative industries, Design, Communication and Social sciences

Griffith University
Three-quarter length academic gowns, open down the front, are the standard academic dress, as is a badge of the Griffith University logo. For those who graduate from a Certificate or an Advanced Certificate program, this is a full academic dress; for those who graduate from an Associate Diploma or a Diploma program, a black Cambridge hood, with white silk edging, is added to the gown. No trencher is worn for non-degree graduates.

Those graduating with a bachelor's degree (with or without honours) or a Graduate Certificate program wear the gown, the badge, the black Cambridge hood with white silk edging, and also wear the trencher. Master's degree graduates wear all of the aforementioned, except that the gown is faced, on both sides of the opening, with 10 cm of white silk.

Doctoral degree graduates have significant variations, depending on the field or reason that the degree is awarded. Doctors of Philosophy wear the black gown, with 10 cm red silk facing on either side and within the sleeves, a black hood with red edging, and a black velvet Tudor bonnet with red braiding. Other doctorate graduates wear a red gown, with the inside of the sleeves lined in white, and a red Cambridge hood with white silk edging, along with the black Tudor bonnet with matching braiding. Doctors of the university essentially receive the inverse of the PhD attire, wearing a red gown, with black facing and sleeve lining, but still with a black Tudor bonnet with red braiding.

See also
Academic dress
Groves classification system
Swotvac

References

External links
Academic Dress at UQ
Campus Life - Academic Dress at Griffith University
Academic Dress Regulations at QUT
University of the Sunshine Coast - Academic Dress Policy
Academic Dress Regulations at the University of Southern Queensland
Central Queensland University Academic Regalia
Academic Dress Regulations at James Cook University
QUT Student Guild: About Academic Gown Hire

Queensland, Australia